The List of National Historic Landmarks in Nebraska contains the landmarks designated by the U.S. Federal Government for the U.S. state of Nebraska.
There are 22 National Historic Landmarks (NHLs) in Nebraska.

Current NHLs in Nebraska
Nebraska's National Historic Landmarks are distributed across 18 of Nebraska's 93 counties.

|}

Historic areas of the National Park System in Nebraska
National Monuments, National Historic Sites, and certain other areas listed in the National Park system are historic landmarks of national importance that are highly protected already, often before the inauguration of the NHL program in 1960, and are then often not also named NHLs per se.  There are two of these in Nebraska.  The National Park Service lists these two together with the NHLs in the state, They are

See also
National Register of Historic Places listings in Nebraska
List of National Historic Landmarks by state
Landmarks in Omaha, Nebraska

References

External links
National Historic Landmark Program at the National Park Service
Lists of National Historic Landmarks

Nebraska
 
National Historic
National Historic Landmarks